Kecojević is a Serbian and Montenegrin surname. It is the name of a brotherhood in Piva, Montenegro, which has origin in the Ivanišević brotherhood from Stari Vlah. The slava of the family is St. John the Baptist (Jovanjdan).

Ivan Kecojević, Montenegrin footballer
Sćepan Kecojević, Montenegrin footballer
Nenad Kecojević, Serbian-Montenegrin footballer
Branko Kecojević, Yugoslav footballer
Simo Kecojević, Montenegrin Serb revolutionary
Ivan Kecojević (19th century), from Pirni Dol, was the tallest man (210 cm) in Montenegro.

References
Светозар Томић, „Пива и Пивљани“
Тома К. Поповић, „Херцег Нови“

External links
 official website - The Kecojevic Clan

Serbian surnames